Oggetti smarriti (internationally released as Lost and Found, Lost Objects and An Italian Woman) is a 1980 Italian comedy-drama film directed by Giuseppe Bertolucci. It entered the Quinzaine des Réalisateurs section at the 1980 Cannes Film Festival.

Cast 
 Mariangela Melato as Marta
 Bruno Ganz as Werner
 Renato Salvatori as Davide
  Maria Luisa Santella as  Gina 
 Laura Morante as  Sara 
 Dina Sassoli as  Suocera

References

External links

1980 films
1980 comedy-drama films
Films directed by Giuseppe Bertolucci
1980 comedy films
1980 drama films
Italian comedy-drama films
1980s Italian films